Shobhana Samarth (17 November 1916 – 9 February 2000) was an Indian actress, director and producer who began her career in the early days of talkie movies in the Hindi film industry and continued in lead roles into the 1950s. 

She started in Marathi cinema. Her first Hindi film, Nigahen Nafrat, was released in 1935. She is best remembered for her portrayal of Sita in Ram Rajya (1943). In 1997, she was honoured with the Filmfare Special Award for her contribution to the arts.

Samarth later produced and directed a pair of movies that launched the careers of her daughters, Nutan and Tanuja.

Early life
Shobhana was born on 17 November 1916 in Bombay, British India, as Saroj Shilotri. An only child, her father Prabhakar Shilotri was a "pioneer banker", having started the Shilotri Bank in Bombay. Her mother Rattan Bai, in 1936, acted in the film Frontiers of Freedom, in Marathi (Swarajyachya Seemewar). 

Shobhna studied initially in Cathedral School, Bombay, for one year. In 1928 her father suffered financial losses and the business went into liquidation. The family then shifted to Bangalore in 1931, where Shobhana attended Baldwin Girls High School. To earn a living, her father taught students on a private basis, while her mother taught in a Marathi school. 

In December that year, her father died of a heart attack and the mother and daughter returned to Bombay to stay with her maternal uncle. Shobhana studied in a convent school, but was unable to complete her matriculation, as she had begun her film career by then. Shobhana also taught privately to make money. 

During this time she met her future husband Kumarsen Samarth, who had just returned from Germany and was keen on directing films. They got engaged and she started work on her first film. Her uncle was opposed to her acting in films, and she and her mother moved out of his home (ironically his daughter and Shobhana's cousin Nalini Jaywant herself became an actress).

Career
Shobana's first film was "Orphans Of Society" (1935), also called Nigahe Nafrat or Vilasi Ishwar for Kolhapur Cinetone, directed by Vinayak and starring Vinayak and Baburao Pendharkar. The film was not a success, but Shobhana was critically acclaimed for her role. 

The film was bilingual, made in Urdu and Marathi. Shobhana claims in an interview that she did not know any Urdu at that time of filming, speaking the dialogues by rote and it was only later that she picked up the language. She was with Kolhapur Cinetone for thirteen months, but acted in one film.

She left Kolhapur Cinetone and joined Sagar Movietone (Sagar Film Company), where she acted in a film called Kokila (1937), directed by Sarvottam Badami, starring Motilal, Sabita Devi and Sitara Devi. Her other film for Sagar was Do Diwane (1936), directed by C. M. Luhar and co-starring Motilal, Yakub and Aruna Devi.

By the end of 1937, Shobhana left Sagar and joined General Films, acting in Industrial India (Nirala Hindustan), directed by Mohan Sinha with Prem Adib and Wasti. The second film for them was Pati Patni (1939), directed by V. M. Gunjal with co-stars Yakub, Sitara Devi and Wasti.

By 1939, she had joined Hindustan Cinetone, making four films with them, which included Kaun Kisi ka (1939), Saubhagya (1940) by C. M. Luhar, and Apni Nagariya (1940) by V. M. Gunjal. She then worked in a film directed by her husband, Kumar Sen Samarth, called Ghar Javai (1941), where she was cast with Damuanna Malvankar.

In 1942 came her career-defining film Bharat Milap, directed by Vijay Bhatt and starring Durga Khote as Kaikeyi, Shobhana as Sita and Prem Adib as Ram. Following this was Ram Rajya in 1943, and Shobhana became identified as Sita, leading to several other films where they recreated the roles. Shobhana as Sita and Prem Adib as Rama became extremely popular and were accepted by the audiences and had them featuring as Rama and Sita on calendars.

Personal life

Shobhana was married to director and cinematographer Kumarsen Samarth from Vile Parle (E), Mumbai. They had three daughters, Nutan, Tanuja and Chatura and a son, Jaideep. Eventually, the couple parted amicably and Shobhana became linked to actor Motilal Rajvansh. 

Two of her daughters, Nutan and Tanuja, also became actresses. Shobhana produced their debut films. Her other daughter, Chatura, is an artist and her son Jaideep is an advertising film producer. Chatura and Jaideep never acted in films. 

Nutan's son Mohnish Bahl is also an actor, as are Tanuja's daughters Kajol and Tanishaa Mukerji. Kajol is married to actor Ajay Devgan. Other members of the dynasty include Shomu Mukherjee, who married Tanuja.

She and her daughter Nutan were estranged for more than two decades, but reconciled in the year 1983 before Nutan's death from cancer in February 1991. At her own death from cancer in 2000, Shobhana had seven granddaughters, one grandson, three great-granddaughters, and two great-grandsons.

Filmography

As Actress

Vilasi Ishwar (1935)
Nigah-e-Nafrat (1935)
Do Diwane (1936)
Kokila (1937)
Pati Patni (1939)
Apni Nagariya (1940)
Savera (1942)
Vijay Lakshmi (1943)
Ram Rajya (1943)
Naukar (1943)
Mahasati Ansuya (1943)
Veer Kunal (1945)
Taramati (1945)
Shahkar (1947)
Sati Toral (1947)
Malika (1947)
Rambaan (1948)
Narasinha Avatar (1949)
Hamari Beti (1950)
Ram Janma (1951)
Insaniyat (1955)
Love in Simla (1960)
Chhalia (1960)
Chitralekha (1964)
Nai Umar Ki Nai Fasal (1965)
Wahan Ke Log (1967)
Ek Bar Mooskura Do (1972)
Do Chor (1972)
Panitheeratha Veedu (1973)
Ghar Dwaar (1985)

As director
Hamari Beti (1950)
Chhabili (1960)
Shaukar, produced and directed by S. Khalil

References

External links

Shobhna website

Deaths from cancer in India
Indian film actresses
Actresses in Hindi cinema
Indian women film directors
20th-century Indian actresses
1916 births
2000 deaths
Actresses in Marathi cinema
Hindi-language film directors
20th-century Indian film directors
Film directors from Mumbai
Actresses from Mumbai
Film producers from Mumbai
Indian women film producers
Marathi film producers
Women artists from Maharashtra
Businesswomen from Maharashtra
20th-century Indian businesspeople
20th-century Indian businesswomen